Kileyevo (Kiläy) is a rural locality (a selo) and the administrative centre of Kileyevsky Selsoviet, Bakalinsky District, Bashkortostan, Russia. The population was 498 as of 2010. There are 10  streets.

Geography 
Kileyevo is located 13 km north of Bakaly (the district's administrative centre) by road. Umirovo is the nearest rural locality.

References 

Rural localities in Bakalinsky District